{{DISPLAYTITLE:C6H4N2O5}}
The molecular formula C6H4N2O5 may refer to:

 Dinitrophenols
 2,3-Dinitrophenol
 2,4-Dinitrophenol
 2,5-Dinitrophenol
 2,6-Dinitrophenol
 3,4-Dinitrophenol
 3,5-Dinitrophenol